Shopgirls is a 1914 British silent drama film directed by Laurence Trimble and starring Florence Turner, Sidney Sinclair and Richard Steele.

Cast
 Florence Turner as Judith 
 Sidney Sinclair as Archer 
 Richard Steele as James Walker 
 Hector Dion as John Carter 
 Rhoda Grey as Grace

References

Bibliography
 Brian McFarlane & Anthony Slide. The Encyclopedia of British Film: Fourth Edition. Oxford University Press, 2013.

External links
 

1914 films
1914 drama films
British silent feature films
British drama films
Films directed by Laurence Trimble
Films set in England
British black-and-white films
Hepworth Pictures films
1910s English-language films
1910s British films
Silent drama films